The second season of Drag Race Thailand had a casting announcement on 4 March 2018. A casting commercial was shown on 13 September 2018, and stated any genders were allowed to apply, as well as non-Thai citizens. Art Arya and Pangina Heals remained as main judges for the season, and the show aired again on the Kantana Group.
The season premiered on 11 January 2019 and ended on 5 April 2019. Beginning on 4 May 2020, the show began airing in America on WOWPresents Plus, with English subtitles. The winner was Angele Anang, with Kana Warrior and Kandy Zyanide finishing as the runners-up. Miss Congeniality was awarded to Maya B’Haro.

Contestants 

(Ages, names, and cities stated are at time of filming.)

Contestant progress

Lip syncs

 The contestant was eliminated after their first time in the bottom.
 The contestant was eliminated after their second time in the bottom.
 The contestant was eliminated after their third time in the bottom.
 The contestant was eliminated after their fourth time in the bottom.

Guest judges

Yai Amat Nimitpark, photographer
Pitt Karchai, actor and singer
Tae Piyarat Kaljareuk, TV executive producer
Nut Prakopsantisook, photographer
Sonya Couling, model
Sakuntala Thianphairot, actress
Vatanika, model
Robert Poonpipat, founder and owner of Mambob Company Limited
Surivipa Poonpipat, actress and comedian
Cindy Bishop, actress and Beauty Pageant Titleholder
Pae Arak, actor and musician
Maria Lynn Ehren, Beauty Pageant Titleholder and model
John Winyu, TV executive director
Moo Asava, fashion designer
James Rusameekae Fagerlund, actor
Madame Mod, Thai drag queen
Hungry, German drag queen
Metinee Kingpayom, actress, model and TV producer
Khemanit "Pancake" Jamikorn, actress and singer
Apaporn Nakornsawan, singer
Jennifer Kim, actress
Sombat "Tue" Tirasaroj, producer
New & Jiew, singer
New Atiwat, public figure
Petch Paopetch, actor
Gene Kasidit, singer
Jai Sira, Thai drag queen

Special guests
Guests who appeared in episodes, but did not judge on the main stage.

Episode 1
Amadiva, contestant on the first season of Drag Race Thailand
Année Mayong, runner-up on the first season of Drag Race Thailand
B Ella, contestant on the first season of Drag Race Thailand
Bunny Be Fly, contestant on the first season of Drag Race Thailand
Dearis Doll, runner-up on the first season of Drag Race Thailand
JAJA, contestant on the first season of Drag Race Thailand
Meannie Minaj, contestant on the first season of Drag Race Thailand
Morrigan, contestant on the first season of Drag Race Thailand
Natalia Pliacam, winner on the first season of Drag Race Thailand
Petchra, contestant on the first season of Drag Race Thailand

Episode 6
Année Mayong, runner-up on the first season of Drag Race Thailand
Dearis Doll, runner-up on the first season of Drag Race Thailand
Natalia Pliacam, winner on the first season of Drag Race Thailand

Episode 7
Fang Nattapong, chef

Episode 11
Debbie Bazoo, singer

Episode 13
RuPaul, American drag queen and RuPaul's Drag Race host

Episodes

References

2019 Thai television seasons
Drag Race Thailand seasons
2019 in LGBT history